Almansa Dam is a dam located in Albacete, on the Vega de Belén River. It is purported to be the world's oldest Masonry gravity dam still in use and the tenth-oldest dam still in existence. Estimated to have been built in the 16th century by Muslim rulers of spain, or in the 14th century, the dam sits 82 feet high, 295 feet long, with a 7500 cubic yard volume, and 1300 acre feet reservoir capacity. Almansa dam holds flood water and is used to provide irrigation. The dam is owned by the City of Almansa.

References

Dams in Spain